Pashupati (Sanskrit Paśupati; devanagari पशुपति ) is a Hindu deity and an incarnation of the Hindu god Shiva as "lord of the animals". But also the "Pashu" means the whole souls or living things or "athma" which  means in Sanskrit  as Jeevan and in Tamil as "உயிர்". So can be translated as the Lord of the "aathmas". Pashupati is mainly worshipped in Nepal and India. Pashupati is also the national deity of Nepal.

Etymology 
Paśupati or Pashupatinath, means "Lord of all animals". It was originally it is also was the epithet of Rudra in the Vedic period. and it is one of the epithets of Shiva also.

History

The earliest claimed evidence of Pashupati comes from the Indus Valley civilization (3300 BCE to 1300 BCE), where the Pashupati seal has been said to represent a proto-Shiva figure.

The Deity 
Pashupatinath is an avatar of Shiva, one of the Hindu Trinity.  He is the male counterpart of Shakti.

The five faces of Pashupatinath represent various incarnations of Shiva; Sadyojata (also known as Barun), Vamdeva (also known as Uma Maheswara), Tatpurusha, Aghor & Ishana. They face West, North, East, South and Zenith respectively, representing Hinduism's five primary elements namely earth, water, air, light and ether.

Puranas describe these faces of Shiva as:

By country

Nepal 

Although Nepal is a secular state, its population is predominantly Hindu. Pashupatinath is revered as a national deity. The Pashupatinath Temple, located at the bank of the river Bagmati, is considered one of the most sacred places in Nepal. In mythology it is said that Lord Pashupatinath started living in Nepal in the form of a deer because he was enchanted by the beauty of Kathmandu Valley.

India 
A Pashupatinath temple is sited on the banks of the Shivana river in Mandsaur, Madhya Pradesh, India. It is one of the most important shrines of Mandsaur, and Lord Shiva in the form of Lord Pashupatinath is its primary deity. Its main attraction is a unique Shiva Linga displaying eight faces of Lord Shiva. The shrine has four doors, representing the cardinal directions.

Pashupata Shaivism

Pashupata Shaivism is one of the oldest Shaivite sects that derives its name from Pashupati. The sect upholds Pashupati "as the supreme deity, the lord of all souls, and the cause of all existence".

See also
 Potnia Theron
 Religion of the Indus Valley Civilization

References

Sources

 Includes Śivasahasranāmakoṣa, a dictionary of names. This work compares eight versions of the Śivasahasranāmāstotra. The preface and introduction (in English) by Ram Karan Sharma provide an analysis of how the eight versions compare with one another. The text of the eight versions is given in Sanskrit.

Forms of Shiva
Animal gods
Horned deities
Hindu gods
Shaivism